Soboleff is a surname, a transliteration variant of the Russian surname Sobolev. Notable people with the surname include:
Vicki Lee Soboleff (born 1964), Haida and Tlingit artist, dancer, and teacher
Vincent Soboleff ( 1890s-1920s), Russian-American photographer, subject of research by Sergei Kan 
Walter Soboleff (1908-2011),  Tlingit scholar, elder and religious leader

Russian-language surnames